Dylan Wight is an Australian politician who is the current member for the district of Tarneit in the Victorian Legislative Assembly. He is a member of the Labor Party and was elected in the 2022 state election, replacing Sarah Connolly, who transferred to the new seat of Laverton.

Wight is a member of the Victorian Socialist Left faction in the Labor Party.

References 

Year of birth missing (living people)
Living people
Members of the Victorian Legislative Assembly
21st-century Australian politicians
Australian Labor Party members of the Parliament of Victoria
Labor Left politicians